Jean Oldroyd (born 15 December 1942) is a British former swimmer.

Swimming career
She competed in two events at the 1960 Summer Olympics.

She represented England and won a gold medal in the medley relay at the 1958 British Empire and Commonwealth Games in Cardiff, Wales.

References

1942 births
Living people
British female swimmers
Olympic swimmers of Great Britain
Swimmers at the 1960 Summer Olympics
Sportspeople from Dewsbury
Commonwealth Games medallists in swimming
Commonwealth Games gold medallists for England
Swimmers at the 1958 British Empire and Commonwealth Games
Medallists at the 1958 British Empire and Commonwealth Games